Dead woman may refer to:

Geography

Dead Woman's Pass, a mountain pass in the Andes
Dead Woman Hills, Caddo County, Oklahoma
Dead Woman's Hill, a hill near Sandridge, Hertfordshire, England
Dead Woman's Hill, a hill located opposite Deadman's Hill near Coggeshall, Essex, England
Dead Woman's Ditch, a linear earthwork in Dowsborough Camp, Somerset, England. 
La Mujer Muerta (The Dead Woman), a mountain range in the Sistema Central, Spain
Dead Woman Mountain, Morocco (Montaña de la Mujer Muerta), a mountain near Ceuta, close to the North African Coast
Turó de la Dona Morta (Dead Woman hill), a mountain near Maçanet de la Selva, Catalonia, Spain
La Noyée (the drowned lady), a mountain range near Notre-Dame-des-Monts, Quebec 
Dead Women Crossing, a small community in Custer County, Oklahoma
Torre de la Malmuerta (Tower of the Bad Death Woman), a gate tower in Córdoba, Spain

Movies and theatre

Dead Woman from Beverly Hills, a German drama film 
Dead Woman's Shoes, an episode from the television series The New Twilight Zone
The Dead Girl, an American mystery drama film
A Dead Woman on Holiday, a play by Julia Pascal

See also
List of mountain ranges in the world named The Sleeping Lady
Deadman Hills
Dead Girl (disambiguation)